Convoy PQ 3 was the fourth of the Arctic Convoys of World War II by which the Western Allies supplied material aid to the Soviet Union in its fight with Nazi Germany. The Convoy sailed from Hvalfjord, Iceland on 9 November 1941 and arrived at Archangelsk on 22 November 1941.

Ships
The convoy consisted of 8 ships (6 British and 2 Panamanian flagged) escorted by the cruiser HMS Kenya, the destroyer HMS Intrepid, minesweepers and armed trawlers. One merchant ship, MV Briarwood, returned to Iceland with damage from ice; the others arrived safely.

Ships in the convoy
The following information is from the Arnold Hague Convoy Database.

References

 Richard Woodman, Arctic Convoys 1941–1945, 1994, 
 Convoy web

PQ 03